The Wedding on Solö (Swedish: Bröllopet på Solö) is a 1946 Swedish comedy film directed by Ivar Johansson and starring Adolf Jahr, Rut Holm and Sigbrit Molin. It was shot at the Centrumateljéerna Studios in Stockholm. The film's sets were designed by the art director Arthur Spjuth. Inspired by a 1915 play of the same title by Oscar Wennersten, it is a sequel to the 1945 film The Österman Brother's Virago.

Cast
 Adolf Jahr as Kalle Österman
 Rut Holm as 	Agneta Österman
 Sigbrit Molin as 	Ella
 Sven Magnusson as 	Torsten
 Emy Hagman as 	Anna
 Lasse Krantz as 	Anders
 John Elfström as 	Anton Andersson
 Ingemar Holde as 	Isak
 Sten Lindgren as Vicar Bång
 Birger Åsander as 	County Police
 Carl Reinholdz as Sjöberg
 Anna Olin as Cook

References

Bibliography 
 Qvist, Per Olov & von Bagh, Peter. Guide to the Cinema of Sweden and Finland. Greenwood Publishing Group, 2000.

External links 
 

1946 films
Swedish comedy films
1946 comedy films
1940s Swedish-language films
Films directed by Ivar Johansson
Swedish black-and-white films
Swedish films based on plays
1940s Swedish films